The Zurich University of Applied Sciences (ZHAW) located in the city of Winterthur, with facilities in Zurich and Wädenswil, is one of the largest University of Applied Sciences in Switzerland and is part of the Zürcher Fachhochschule.

Currently, the university has eight schools, covering architecture and civil engineering, health, linguistics, life sciences and facility management, applied psychology, social work, engineering and management and law.

The ZHAW School of Management and Law obtained AACSB accreditation in 2015.

History
The Zurich University of Applied Sciences was founded in September 2007, when the previously independent institutions Zurich University of Applied Sciences Winterthur, University of Applied Sciences Wädenswil, the School of Social Work and the School of Applied Psychology in Zurich merged. The former Zurich University of Applied Sciences Winterthur was itself made up out of schools with long histories: the Technikum Winterthur was founded in 1874 as Switzerland's largest engineering school, and the Höhere Wirtschafts- und Verwaltungsschule was established in 1968. Both schools were the first of their kind in Switzerland.

Programmes
A total of 26 bachelor's and 10 consecutive master's degree programmes are currently offered. The general language of courses is German (Hochdeutsch). Notably all lectures at the School of Management and Law's bachelor programme in International Management are held in English, as are courses for exchange students. Generally, there is an increasing use of English observed in many other programmes.

 School of Applied Linguistics: The School of Applied Linguistics is further divided into the Institute of Translation and Interpreting (IUED), and the Institute of Applied Media Studies (IAM). The Institute of Applied Media Studies offers a Bachelor of Arts in communication, with specialisation in journalism and organisational communication. The Institute of Translation and Interpreting offers a bachelor's degree in translation, with specialisations in multilingual communication, multimodal communication and technical communication. It also offers a Master of Arts in Applied Linguistics, with specialisations in conference interpretation, organisational communication and professional translation.
School of Applied Psychology offers a bachelor's degree and master's degree in applied psychology
School of Architecture, Design, and Civil Engineering offers a bachelor's degree and master's degree in architecture and a bachelor's degree in civil engineering.
School of Engineering offers a master's degree in engineering and bachelor's degree in aviation, computer science, electrical engineering, engineering and management with specialisations in industrial engineering and business mathematics, enterprise computing, mechanical design and engineering, mechanical engineering informatics, materials and process engineering, systems engineering / mechatronics and transportation systems.
School of Health Professions offers a master's degree in nursing and physiotherapy. a bachelor's degree in midwifery, nursing, occupational therapy and physiotherapy.
School of Life Sciences and Facility Management offers master's degrees in facility management and life sciences. Bachelor's degrees are offered in biotechnology, chemistry, food technology, environmental engineering and facility management.

School of Management and Law offers master's degrees in accounting and controlling, banking and finance, business administration, business information technology, international business, and management and law. It also offers bachelor's degrees in business administration, business information technology, business law, and international management. The best students can be invited to join the International Honor Society Beta Gamma Sigma. The School's MSc International Business was ranked 64th in the 2020 Financial Times Ranking.
School of Social Work offers both a bachelor's and master's degree in social work.

Partner universities (selection) 
 University of Technology Sydney (Australia)
 Christ University, Bengaluru (India)
 Technische Universität Wien (Austria)
 Technische Universität Graz (Austria)
 UQAM - Université du Québec à Montréal (Canada)
 Århus Universitet (Denmark)
 Københavns Universitet (Denmark)
 Roskilde Universitetscenter (Denmark)
 Syddansk Universitet (Denmark)
 University of Helsinki (Finland)
 ESSCA École de Management (France)
 ESC Rennes School of Business (France)
 Ecole de Management Strasbourg (France)
 Université Paris Dauphine (France)
 Humboldt-Universität zu Berlin (Germany)
 Hochschule für Wirtschaft und Recht Berlin (Germany)
 Universität Witten/Herdecke (Germany)
 Universität Bielefeld (Germany)
 Universität Leipzig (Germany)
 Corvinus University of Budapest (Hungary)
 Technological University Dublin (Ireland)
 LUISS Guido Carli (Italy)
 Università degli studi di Modena e Reggio Emilia (Italy)
 Warsaw School of Economics (Poland)
 Cracow University of Economics (Poland)
 PSB Paris School of Business
 Jagiellonian University of Cracow (Poland)
 Saint-Petersburg State University (Russia)
 University of Cape Town (South Africa)
 Göteborgs universitet (Sweden)
 Koç University (Turkey)
 Sabanci University (Turkey)
 Cass Business School (Great Britain)
 University of Leicester (Great Britain)
 London Metropolitan University (Great Britain)
 Baruch College, CUNY (United States)
 California State University (United States)
 Boston University (United States)
 University of California (United States)
 Konkuk University (South Korea)

Notes and references

See also
List of largest universities by enrollment in Switzerland

External links

 ZHAW website

Universities of Applied Sciences in Switzerland
Education in Zürich
Educational institutions established in 1986
Educational institutions established in 1874
Business schools in Switzerland
Aviation schools
1986 establishments in Switzerland
Schools in Zürich